Autódromo de León in León, Guanajuato is a motorsport venue. The racetrack was opened in 1976. The Copa Marlboro, Formula 2, Formula 3, Copa Mustang, Tractocamiones, Sport Prototipos, Motos 600, Formula K, Superformula and GT-championships ran or are running at this venue. Currently the venue hosts some stages of Rally Mexico.

The track hosted one NASCAR PEAK Mexico Series in the 2017 season.

Layout

The track has the shape of a half arrow and has a length .

References

External links

Autodromo de León race results at Racing-Reference

Leon
NASCAR tracks
Sports venues in Guanajuato